The New Zealand Handball Federation (NZHF) is the governing body for the sport of handball and beach handball in New Zealand. NZHF is member of the Oceania Continent Handball Federation (OCHF), International Handball Federation (IHF) and the Commonwealth Handball Association.

Founded in 2005, NZHF is recognised by IHF in 2009.

National teams
 New Zealand men's national handball team
 New Zealand women's national handball team
 New Zealand men's national junior handball team
 New Zealand men's national youth handball team

Region/Clubs
 Auckland
 Auckland Region Handball
Taranaki
Taranaki HC (Inactive)
 Manawatu
 Massey University HC (Inactive)
 Wellington
 Fruit Flies HC
 Hutt Hunters HC
Hutt Hawks HC (Inactive)
 Northern Aguilas HC
 Spartanz HC
 Vikings HC
 Victoria University HC
 Canterbury
 Canterbury Quakes HC
 Canterbury University HC (Inactive)
 Otago
 Otago University HC
Queenstown HC
Southland HC

NZHF Club Championships

Men competition

Women competition

See also
 Oceania Handball Nations Cup
 Oceania Handball Challenge Trophy
 Oceania Youth Handball Championship

References

 Oceania Continent Handball Federation

External links
 Official Page
 Profile on International Handball Federation webpage
 NZHF YouTube channel

National members of the Oceania Continent Handball Federation
Handball in New Zealand
Handball
Sports organizations established in 2005
2005 establishments in New Zealand
Handball governing bodies
National members of the International Handball Federation